The 2003 FC Spartak Moscow season was the club's 12th season in the Russian Premier League season. Spartak finished the season in 10th position, qualifying for the 2004 UEFA Intertoto Cup. In the Russian Cup, Spartak won the 2002–03 cup, whilst they were knocked out of the 2003–04 cup at the Round of 32 stage by Kuban Krasnodar. In Europe, Spartak reached the Third Round of the UEFA Cup which also took place during the 2004 season.

Season events
On 7 November, Wojciech Kowalewski made his loan move from Shakhtar Donetsk permanent by signing a five-year contract with Spartak.

Squad

On loan

Left club during season

Transfers

In

Loans in

Out

Loans out

Released

Competitions

Premier League

Results by round

Results

League table

Russian Cup

2002-03

Final

2003-04

UEFA Cup

Squad statistics

Appearances and goals

|-
|colspan="14"|Players away from the club on loan:

|-
|colspan="14"|Players who appeared for Spartak Moscow but left during the season:

|}

Goal scorers

Clean sheets

Disciplinary record

References

FC Spartak Moscow seasons
Spartak Moscow